Yeray is a given name. Notable people with the name include:

Yeray Álvarez, a Spanish footballer
Yeray González Luis, a Spanish footballer
Yeray Gómez, a Spanish footballer
Yeray Luxem, a Belgian athlete
Yeray Patiño, a Spanish footballer
Yeray Sabariego, a Spanish footballer